The PartyPoker.com Football & Poker Legends Cup is a televised poker tournament, airing in the United Kingdom on Five from April 2006 onwards, in the lead-up to the 2006 FIFA World Cup.

Format 
Each team consists of three players: two poker professionals, and one former or current professional football (soccer) player. Elimination matches take place between two countries, with the table winner progressing along with the rest of his team to the next round of the tournament.

Three hours are allowed for each match. If a result does not occur within that time limit, a one-hour period of extra time takes place. If there is still no result, a penalty shootout then takes place.

If the tournament director, "Mad" Marty Wilson notices any attempts at collusion, he administers a yellow card to that player, with the result of half of that players' chips being distributed evenly to the opposition team. If a second infraction is noticed, a red card is shown to the player, eliminating the player from the tournament immediately, with all of that players' chips being distributed evenly to the opposition team.

The idea that collusion could be used as a tactic to gain an advantage meant that the format of the competition was widely criticised.

Commentary was provided by Jesse May and Padraig Parkinson.

Teams

Results

Pre-season friendly match

Regular season 

(1) received yellow card
(2) won match in extra time

External links 
Poker at five.tv
I Made a Mistake (article by Daniel Negreanu)
Wales vs U.S.A. (article by Dave Colclough)
World Cup Australia vs Canada (article by Tony G)
World Cup of Poker – London (2nd article by Tony G)

Entain
Channel 5 (British TV channel) original programming
Poker tournaments in Europe
Television shows about poker
2006 British television series debuts
2006 British television series endings